No Problem is an album by jazz saxophonist Sonny Rollins, released on the Milestone label in 1981, featuring performances by Rollins with Bobby Broom, Bobby Hutcherson, Bob Cranshaw and Tony Williams.

Reception

The Allmusic review by Scott Yanow states: "Rollins is in generally fine form but none of the compositions are all that inspiring and for these fine players this session sounds too safe and routine."

Track listing 
All compositions by Sonny Rollins except as indicated
 "No Problem" - 7:40  
 "Here You Come Again" (Barry Mann, Cynthia Weil) - 5:32  
 "Jo Jo" (Bobby Hutcherson) - 5:05  
 "Coconut Bread" - 4:22  
 "Penny Saved" (Bobby Broom) - 5:44  
 "Illusions" (Frederick Hollander) - 2:17  
 "Joyous Lake" - 5:32  
 Recorded at Fantasy Studios, Berkeley, CA, on December 9–15, 1981

Personnel 
 Sonny Rollins - tenor saxophone
 Bobby Hutcherson - vibes
 Bobby Broom - guitar
 Bob Cranshaw - bass
 Tony Williams - drums

References 

1981 albums
Milestone Records albums
Sonny Rollins albums